This is a list of volcanoes in Antarctica.

Table
A 2017 study claimed to have found 138 volcanoes, of which 91 were previously unknown. Some volcanoes are entirely under the ice sheet. Unconfirmed volcanoes are not included in the table below.

See also 
 Geology of Antarctica
 Lists of volcanoes

References

Bibliography 
 
 Volcano World Web site

Antarctica

Volcanoes